The Druzhba Multipurpose Arena is an indoor arena in Moscow, Russia, part of the Luzhniki Sports Complex. It was built in 1979, and the first competition held there was the finals of the 7th USSR Summer Spartakiad. It hosted volleyball preliminaries of the 1980 Summer Olympics and was a venue of the 1986 Goodwill Games (women's basketball, freestyle wrestling, judo and handball events were held there). The capacity of the arena is for 3,500 people and is the regular home venue of WVC Dynamo Moscow Volleyball team.

Notes

References
1980 Summer Olympics official report. Volume 2. Part 1. pp. 61–4.

External links
Official website

Indoor arenas built in the Soviet Union
Indoor arenas in Russia
Sports venues in Moscow
Volleyball venues in Russia
Venues of the 1980 Summer Olympics
Olympic volleyball venues
Handball venues in Russia
Basketball venues in Russia
Sports venue
Sports venues completed in 1979
1979 establishments in Russia